The 1997 FIA GT Spa 4 Hours was the fifth race of the 1997 FIA GT Championship season. It was run at Circuit de Spa-Francorchamps, Belgium on July 20, 1997.

Official results
Class winners in bold.  Cars failing to complete 75% of winner's distance marked as Not Classified (NC).

Statistics
 Pole Position – #8 BMW Motorsport – 2:08.984
 Fastest Lap – #11 AMG-Mercedes – 2:12.058
 Distance – 704.374 km
 Average Speed – 174.701 km/h

External links
 World Sports Prototype Racing – Race Results

S
Spa 4 Hours
Auto races in Belgium